Hipparchus or Hipparch of Euboea (fl. 4th century BC) was one of the warmest partisans of Philip of Macedon, who rewarded him for his zeal by appointing him, together with Automedon and Cleitarchus, to be rulers, or, as Demosthenes calls them, tyrants of Eretria, supported by a force of mercenary troops. From an anecdote mentioned by Plutarch, it appears that Philip entertained for him feelings of warm personal regard.

References
Smith, William (editor); Dictionary of Greek and Roman Biography and Mythology, "Cleitarchus", Boston, (1867)

Notes

Ancient Greek rulers
Ancient Eretrians
4th-century BC Greek people
Philip II of Macedon